Bloody Richard (Richard Goes to Hell) is a 2017 Italian musical drama film directed by Roberta Torre, starring Massimo Ranieri and inspired on William Shakespeare's Richard III.

The film has been presented out of competition at the 35th Turin Film Festival.

Plot
Riccardo Mancini leaves a psychiatric hospital where he spent long years due to a mysterious crime. He is determined to take revenge and conquer power within his underworld family; he will have no qualms about getting rid of his brothers and those who hinder his path and he will do so by singing.

Cast
 Massimo Ranieri as Riccardo Mancini
 Sonia Bergamasco as The Queen Mother
 Silvia Gallerano as Betta Mancini
 Ivan Franěk as Romolo Lo Zingaro (The Gypsy)
 Tommaso Ragno as Edoardo Mancini La Jena (The Hyena)

References

External links

2017 films
2010s musical drama films
Italian musical drama films
2010s Italian-language films
2017 drama films